Raymond Moore (1920 – 1987) was a post-war English art photographer.

Born in Wallasey, then part of Cheshire, he served in the RAF and then trained as a painter at the Royal College of Art. After graduating, he was asked to set up a photography department at Watford College. Moore became interested in photography at a time when photography was still viewed in Britain as an undistinguished craft rather than a serious art form. Influenced by some of the images in Hugo van Wadenoyen's seminal 1947 Wayside Snapshots book - a book which marked the start of the decisive British break with Pictorialism - Moore began to see fresh possibilities in the composition & framing of everyday English landscapes. Moore went on to create black & white fine art photographs; having his first solo gallery show in 1959. He continued teaching for most of his life, and he is widely regarded as one of the great teachers. Visiting the U.S. in 1968, he worked with photographer Minor White at MIT and was influenced by Harry Callahan and Aaron Siskind. He had his first major solo show in 1970 at the Art Institute of Chicago. In 1974 he became a lecturer at the influential Trent Polytechnic, Nottingham, but left in 1978 to pursue his own creative work in Cumbria. From around 1976 the climate in England slowly began to change in favour of art photography; and so Moore finally saw acclaim in his own country with a major London retrospective show at the Hayward Gallery, the publication of a strong book collection of his photography, and a BBC television documentary about his work. Moore's influential work has now been out-of-print for more than twenty years.

Quotes from Moore

"If we did but know it, the weather we so revile in these islands is about as perfect for photographic purposes as it could be made... To this vile weather we owe our most charming effects. If there was no bad weather, there would be no clouds and no gales, no rain and no snow. If there is one time more than another when the country smiles the most, it is during rain."—Raymond Moore.

"Photography is a means of sifting or extracting visual phenomena - it can be solely concerned with conveying factual information about objects in a particular position in time and space - or it can convey an awareness or revelation of the marvellous."—Raymond Moore.

"I'm just a go-between, things discover me, I don't discover them. But in them I can find myself and grow"—Raymond Moore.

Books of photography by Moore

 Photographs. (Welsh Arts Council pamphlet, 1968)
 Murmurs at Every Turn: The Photographs of Raymond Moore. (Travelling Light, 1981)
 Every So Often: Photographs. (BBC, 1983) (Accompanying a BBC television film on Moore)
 49 Prints. (British Council; 1986)
 Large portfolio published in Creative Camera International Yearbook, (Coo Press 1976)

References

External links
The Golden Fleece: Article Index - information on Moore and examples of his work.

1920 births
1987 deaths
Photographers from Cheshire
Alumni of the Royal College of Art
Academics of Nottingham Trent University
People from Wallasey